The women's javelin throw event at the 2014 African Championships in Athletics was held on August 13 on Stade de Marrakech.

Results

References

2014 African Championships in Athletics
Javelin throw at the African Championships in Athletics
2014 in women's athletics